The 1832–33 United States Senate elections were held on various dates in various states. As these U.S. Senate elections were prior to the ratification of the Seventeenth Amendment in 1913, senators were chosen by state legislatures. Senators were elected over a wide range of time throughout 1832 and 1833, and a seat may have been filled months late or remained vacant due to legislative deadlock. In these elections, terms were up for the senators in Class 1.

The Anti-Jacksonian coalition assumed control of the Senate from the Jacksonian coalition, despite Andrew Jackson's victory in the 1832 presidential election.

Change in composition

Before the elections 
After the January 3, 1832 special election in Indiana.

As a result of the regular elections

At the beginning of the first session, December 2, 1833

Race summaries

Special elections during the 22nd Congress 
In these special elections, the winners were seated during 1832 or before March 4, 1833; ordered by election date.

Races leading to the 23rd Congress 
In these regular elections, the winner was seated on March 4, 1833; ordered by state.

All of the elections involved the Class 1 seats.

Elections during the 23rd Congress 
There were two late regular elections and two special elections, in which the winners were seated in 1833 after March 4.  They are ordered here by election date.

Connecticut

Delaware

Georgia (special) 

Jacksonian George Troup resigned November 8, 1833 and Jacksonian John Pendleton King was elected November 21, 1833 to finish the term that would end March 3, 1835.

Indiana 

Class 1 Anti-Jacksonian senator James Noble died February 26, 1831, having served in office since statehood in 1816.  Anti-Jacksonian Robert Hanna was appointed August 19, 1831 to serve until a special election, and Hanna did not run for the seat.

Indiana (special) 

On January 3, 1832, Jacksonian John Tipton was elected to finish Noble's term, ending March 3, 1833.

Indiana (regular) 

That same day, Jacksonian John Tipton was also elected to the next term, beginning March 4, 1833.

Maine

Maryland 

Joseph Kent won election over Samuel Smith by a margin of 41.86%, or 36 votes, for the Class 1 seat.

Massachusetts

Mississippi 

Jacksonian senator Powhatan Ellis resigned July 16, 1832 to become a U.S. District Judge.  The governor appointed Jacksonian John Black to finish the term.  But when the term ended March 3, 1833, the legislature had failed to appoint a successor.

Black was eventually elected to the seat November 22, 1833, this time as an Anti-Jacksonian.

Missouri

New Jersey

New York

New York (special) 

William L. Marcy had been elected in 1831 to the class 3 seat. In November 1832, Marcy was elected Governor, and upon taking office resigned his Senate seat on January 1, 1833.

On January 4, 1833, Silas Wright Jr. was the choice of both the Assembly and the Senate and was declared elected.

New York (regular) 

For the regular election, Nathaniel P. Tallmadge received majorities in both the Assembly and the Senate, and was declared elected. Due to the controversy about his eligibility, he received only very small majorities - one more than necessary in the Senate, and four more than necessary in the Assembly - although his party had large majorities in both houses of the Legislature.

Ohio

Pennsylvania 

The election was held on eleven separate dates from December 1832 to December 1833. On December 7, 1833, Samuel McKean was elected by the Pennsylvania General Assembly to the United States Senate.

The Pennsylvania General Assembly, consisting of the House of Representatives and the Senate, convened on December 11, 1832, for the regularly scheduled Senate election for the term beginning on March 4, 1833. A total of thirty-six ballots were recorded. Ballots 1-17 were recorded on four separate dates (11th, 12th, 13th, 15th) in December 1832. Ballots 18-21 were recorded on two separate dates (9th and 10th) in January 1833. Ballots 22-29 were recorded on two separate dates (19th and 20th) in February 1833. The thirtieth ballot was recorded on March 12, 1833, followed by three additional ballots on April 2. Following the thirty-third ballot on April 2, the election convention adjourned sine die without electing a Senator.

Upon the expiration of incumbent George M. Dallas's term on March 4, 1833, the seat was vacated. It was vacant until the election convention of the General Assembly re-convened on December 7, 1833, and elected Jacksonian Samuel McKean to the seat after three additional ballots. The results of the third and final ballot (thirty-sixth ballot in total) of both houses combined during the December 7 session are as follows:

|-
|-bgcolor="#EEEEEE"
| colspan="3"  | Totals
| 133
| 100.00%
|}

Rhode Island

South Carolina (special) 

There were two special elections to the U.S. Senate in South Carolina during this cycle.

South Carolina (special, class 2) 
The first election, on December 29, 1832, was to the class 2 seat held by Nullifier Robert Y. Hayne, who had resigned December 13, 1832 to become Governor of South Carolina.  That election, for the term ending March 3, 1835, was won by Nullifier John C. Calhoun.

South Carolina (special, class 3) 
The second election, on November 25, 1833, was to the Class 3 seat held by Nullifier Stephen D. Miller, who had resigned March 2, 1833.  That election, for the term ending March 3, 1837, was won by Nullifier William C. Preston.

Tennessee

Vermont

Virginia

Virginia (special) 

Incumbent Jacksonian senator Littleton Tazewell resigned July 16, 1832 to become Governor of Virginia. On December 10, 1832, Jacksonian William C. Rives was elected to finish the Class 2 seat's term ending March 3, 1837.  He would only serve, however, until his February 22, 1834 resignation.

Virginia (regular) 

Incumbent senator (and future president), John Tyler was re-elected to the Class 1 seat in 1833, changing from Jacksonian to Anti-Jacksonian.

See also 
 1832 United States elections
 1832 United States presidential election
 1832–33 United States House of Representatives elections
 22nd United States Congress
 23rd United States Congress

Notes

References 

 Party Division in the Senate, 1789-Present, via Senate.gov
The New York Civil List compiled in 1858 (see: pg. 63 for U.S. Senators; pg. 129 for State Senators 1833; pg. 213f for Members of Assembly 1833)
Members of the 23rd United States Congress
History of Political Parties in the State of New-York, Vol. II by Jabez Delano Hammond (•State election, 1832 State election: pg. 424; Speaker election, 1833 Speaker election: pg. 430; U.S. Senate election, 1833 Senate election: pg. 432f)
Pennsylvania Election Statistics: 1682-2006 from the Wilkes University Election Statistics Project